The French Tennis Federation (FFT) is the governing body for tennis in France. It was founded in 1920, and is tasked with the organisation, co-ordination and promotion of the sport. It is recognised by the International Tennis Federation and by the French Minister for Sports. Its headquarters are at the Roland Garros stadium. It was founded under the name Fédération Française de Lawn Tennis until it changed to the Fédération Française de Tennis in 1976. The roles of the FFT include organising tennis competitions in France, most notably the French Open, supporting and co-ordinating tennis clubs, and managing the French tennis teams, including their Davis Cup and Fed Cup teams.

History

Logos

References

External links
Official site (in French)

France
Tennis in France
Tennis
1920 establishments in France